Salnava Parish is an administrative unit of Ludza Municipality in the Latgale region of Latvia. Prior to the 2009 administrative reforms it was part of the former Ludza District.

Towns, villages and settlements of Salnava parish 
  - parish administrative center

References 

Parishes of Latvia
Ludza Municipality
Latgale